The list of shipwrecks in February 1916 includes ships sunk, foundered, grounded, or otherwise lost during February 1916.

1 February

2 February

4 February

5 February

6 February

7 February

8 February

9 February

10 February

11 February

12 February

13 February

15 February

16 February

17 February

19 February

20 February

21 February

22 February

23 February

24 February

25 February

26 February

27 February

28 February

29 February

Unknown date

References

1916-02
 02